This is the Residential Tenancies Act of Ontario.  For other jurisdictions, see Residential Tenancies Act (disambiguation).

The Residential Tenancies Act, 2006 (RTA 2006) is the law in the province of Ontario, Canada, that governs landlord and tenant relations in residential rental accommodations.  The Act received royal assent on June 22, 2006, and was proclaimed into law on January 31, 2007.  The Act repealed and replaced the Tenant Protection Act, 1997. Ontario's Landlord and Tenant Board is governed by the act.

Contents
The Residential Tenancies Act 2006 contains chapters on the meaning of a tenancy, the duties of landlords and tenants, "security of tenure" and the list of legitimate reasons that a landlord can evict a tenant, and a system of rent regulation.

Section 120 contains the key provision on rent regulation, which says that rents cannot increase by more than 2.5 per cent in a year.

External links
 
 
 

2006 in Canadian law
Ontario provincial legislation
Landlord–tenant law
2006 in Ontario
Housing legislation in Canada